Frinnaryd is a locality situated in Aneby Municipality, Jönköping County, Sweden with 204 inhabitants in 2010.

References

External links 

Populated places in Jönköping County
Populated places in Aneby Municipality